Andriy Sirovatchenko is a Paralympic swimmer from Ukraine competing mainly in category S9 events.

Andriy has twice competed at the Paralympics in 2004 and 2008. In 2004 he competed in the 100m backstroke and 100m freestyle finishing last in both heats, the 50m freestyle finishing eighth in the final.  He was also part of the Ukrainian quartets that finished sixth in the 4 × 100 m medley and fifth in the heat of the 4 × 100 m freestyle. In the 2008 games he was again part of the 4 × 100 m medley but this time they picked up a bronze medal, he also competed in the 50m freestyle, 100m freestyle, 100m butterfly failing to make the final of any of them and finished sixth in the final of the 100m backstroke.

References

External links
 

Paralympic swimmers of Ukraine
Swimmers at the 2004 Summer Paralympics
Swimmers at the 2008 Summer Paralympics
Paralympic bronze medalists for Ukraine
Ukrainian male butterfly swimmers
Living people
Swimmers at the 2012 Summer Paralympics
Medalists at the 2008 Summer Paralympics
S9-classified Paralympic swimmers
Year of birth missing (living people)
Medalists at the World Para Swimming European Championships
Paralympic medalists in swimming
Ukrainian male freestyle swimmers
21st-century Ukrainian people